Snell Creek is a  watercourse in Napa County, California. It is situated approximately five miles north of Aetna Springs and is a tributary of Butts Creek, which ultimately merges into Putah Creek.

Plants
Snell Valley is noted for its biodiversity of flora, and within Snell Valley is the Missimer Wildflower Preserve. An example of wildflowers in the Snell Creek watershed is yellow mariposa lily, Calochortus luteus.

Line notes

References
 David L. Durham. 2001. Durham's place names of California's old wine country, page 65
 C. Michael Hogan. 2009. Yellow Mariposa Lily: Calochortus luteus, GlobalTwitcher.com, ed. N. Stromberg

Rivers of Napa County, California
Rivers of Northern California